Domtar Corporation is an American company that manufactures and markets wood fiber-based paper and pulp product. The company operates pulp and paper mills in Windsor, Quebec, Dryden, Ontario, Kamloops, British Columbia, Ashdown, Arkansas, Hawesville, Kentucky, Plymouth, North Carolina, Marlboro County, South Carolina, and Kingsport, Tennessee. While the company operated independently for several decades with listing on the Toronto and New York stock exchanges, the company was acquired by Paper Excellence in November 2021 and has since operated as a subsidiary. 

Specifically, the firm designs, manufactures, markets and distributes a wide range of business, commercial printing, publication as well as technical and specialty papers with recognized brands such as Cougar, Lynx Opaque Ultra, Husky Opaque Offset, First Choice, Sandpiper (premium 100% recycled unbleached), and Domtar EarthChoice Office Paper, part of a family of environmentally and socially responsible papers.

Domtar owns and operates Domtar Distribution Group, an extensive network of paper distribution facilities. The company overall employs nearly 6,400 people. Its head offices are in Montreal and Fort Mill, South Carolina.

History

Origins in Britain

In 1848, Henry Potter Burt founded Burt, Boulton Holdings Ltd. in England, a company that specialized in treating timber against rot from moisture. The company used substances, such as creosote derived from coal tar, to prolong lumber's useful life, supplying railway ties and pilings for wharves and foundations throughout Europe and the British Empire. Within eleven years Burt, Boulton was exporting to North America and acquired a sawmill in Quebec's Eastern Townships.

In the coal-intensive environment of the nineteenth and early twentieth centuries, there was an ever-increasing source of coal tar, and a demand for treated wood. Growth continued for Burt, Boulton Holdings Ltd. and led to the founding of a new company on February 4, 1903. It was called the Dominion Tar and Chemical Company, Limited. Dominion Tar's first plant was located in Sydney, Nova Scotia, and began operations just eight months later.

In 1910, the company obtained two major contracts. The first, from the Canadian Pacific Railway, was to treat railway ties, and the second, with the Lake Superior Iron & Steel Company (a predecessor of Algoma Steel), was to process tar produced from the coke ovens at its Sault Ste. Marie, Ontario mill. This required the financing of two new plants at opposite ends of Eastern Canada. Burt, Boulton retained the majority of shares in the company but took on Senator John S. McLennan from Nova Scotia and Drummond, McCall & Co. of Montreal as the corporation's first Canadian shareholders.

When the First World War broke out in 1914, Dominion Tar established its head office in Montreal, Canada.

Incorporation in Canada

Throughout the first quarter of the twentieth century, Dominion Tar opened offices in Toronto, Halifax, Vancouver, and Calgary. On November 26, 1928, Canadian business magnates Sir Herbert Holt of Montreal and Harold Gundy of Toronto acquired the British-owned corporation.

In 1929, Dominion Tar and Chemical Company Ltd was formed as a Canadian corporation in order to acquire the assets of the former company, and shortly thereafter offered its shares for public sale. It was then listed on the Montreal and Toronto stock exchanges. By the following year, it had unlisted trading privileges on the American Stock Exchange.

During the Great Depression of 1931–36, operating costs were slashed and capital expenditures delayed. Employee wages were reduced 10% and management was consolidated. Several plants were closed — some temporarily, others permanently. Dominion Tar withheld its annual dividend on common stock from 1932 to 1937.

In 1937, Dominion Tar invested in Industrial Minerals, an Alberta company that was producing salt under the Sifto brand.

In the 1950s, the firm's assets grew from $35 million to over $500 million, with annual sales surging from $33 million to $325 million, and annual net profits climbing from less than $2.25 million to almost $19 million. Operations were still based on coal tar, salt, and construction materials. However, throughout this decade the company negotiated a series of acquisitions to fuel its growth:

 In 1956, it began accumulating shares of Howard Smith Paper Mills, Canada's largest fine paper company.
 In 1958, it entered the field of construction materials with the acquisition of Gypsum, Lime, & Alabastine Canada Limited, makers of gypsum wallboard

It also elevated Dominion Tar into the ranks of the largest Canadian-owned corporations, with plants located across the country, over $350 million in assets, and annual sales to match.

While continuing to invest in all its business sectors, Dominion Tar began to concentrate efforts on paper manufacturing, and converted the Windsor, Quebec pulp mill to exclusive production of bleached hardwood pulp and building a new greenfield pulp mill in Lebel-sur-Quévillon.

In 1962, the Cape Breton operations were abandoned, leaving behind Dominion Tar's contribution to the Sydney Tar Ponds, a Canadian hazardous waste site on Cape Breton Island, Nova Scotia.

Creation of Domtar

In 1961, Dominion Tar entered into a merger with several other companies:

 Howard Smith Paper (involving those shareholders who had not yet sold out to Dominion Tar),
 St. Lawrence Corporation Limited, and
 Hinde & Dauch Limited.

In 1965, Dominion Tar & Chemical Company, Limited became known as Domtar Ltd. (later changed to Domtar Inc.). In addition, the newly formed Domtar was reorganized into several operating divisions:

 Chemicals,
 Consumer Products (sold to Bristol Myers in 1967),
 Construction Materials (sold to Georgia Pacific in 1998),
 Kraft and Fine Papers,
 Newsprint and Containerboard, and
 Packaging.

In 1967, the latter three units were consolidated into a single pulp and paper group. By then, total corporate assets had reached $477 million, and Domtar was now determined to become a leader in paper manufacturing.

Acquisitions and rationalizations

Throughout the 1970s, Domtar began to re-evaluate its non-paper businesses as it continued to expand. The first noteworthy venture was the acquisition of Buntin Reid Paper Co. Ltd., the largest independent fine paper merchant in Canada. Next came the modernization and expansion of the flagship Cornwall, Ontario mill (closed in 2006), the expansion of the Caledonia gypsum wallboard plant, investments in a new laminated products plant at Huntsville, Ontario, and the acquisition of McFarlaneson & Hodgson Inc., a major Canadian fine paper merchant. Domtar also launched several joint ventures to increase its lumber operations and to supply more wood to its newsprint mill in Dolbeau, Quebec.

In 1978, Argus Corporation, a long-time controlling shareholder in Domtar, entered into a private deal with MacMillan Bloedel to sell its 19% stake. Macmillan Bloedel proceeded to make a takeover bid for the rest of Domtar's shares, and Domtar retaliated with its own bid for MB's shares. When the Province of British Columbia announced that it was opposing any attempt to acquired MB, both bids were dropped and MB sold its Domtar shares to the Caisse de dépôt et placement du Québec in 1979. In 1981, the Caisse and the Société générale de financement du Québec expanded their shareholdings to a total of 42% of all outstanding common shares.

In 1979, Domtar acquired Reed Limited, a subsidiary of a U.K. pulp and paper manufacturer, with three corrugated container plants, a linerboard mill, and a waste paper recycling plant, all in the Toronto area. That same year, Domtar acquired Kaiser Cement's gypsum resources in the United States and Canada. Lastly, the company founded Domtar Resources Inc. as an entry into the natural gas and oil exploration business in western Canada. The levelling off of energy costs eventually led to the venture's demise.

In the early 1980s, Domtar withdrew from its manufacturing activities abroad and closed its U.K. fine paper mill. Paper remained paramount and Domtar began to explore the potential for paper recycling, and the Packaging Group proceeded to convert purchased waste paper into pulp.

In 1989, the company divested itself of the Arborite Products and Salt divisions, and exited the consumer products business to turn to manufacturing commodities for conversion or packaging prior to sale.

In December 1997, Domtar and Cascades Inc. developed a joint venture called Norampac. A major North American manufacturer and distributor of container board, Norampac is Canada's largest producer of corrugated packaging. Since 2006, Cascades owns Norampac. 

In 1998, it bought the E. B. Eddy Company.

In January 2000, Domtar launched an e-business application, e-PAPER, enabling merchants and distributors to communicate with Domtar via the Internet. It also enabled customers to check on inventory, place orders, and track orders in transit via truck-mounted GPS units.

In July 2000, Domtar completed its acquisition of Ris Paper Company Inc., one of the largest independent merchants of commercial printing and business papers in the United States. On August 7, 2001, Domtar purchased four paper mills and their associated businesses and assets from Georgia-Pacific Corporation for a total of US$1.65 billion. With the acquisition of mills in Ashdown, Arkansas; Nekoosa and Port Edwards in Wisconsin; and Woodland, Maine, Domtar became Canada's largest paper company in terms of sales, third-largest producer of uncoated free sheet paper in North America, and fourth-largest in the world.  The Port Edwards plant was closed in 2008 and sold in 2013, and the Woodland plant was sold in 2010.

In August 2011 Domtar acquired Attends Healthcare, Inc., manufacturer and supplier of incontinence products, from KPS Capital Partners, L.P. for $315 million.  Domtar also purchased Attends Healthcare Limited, manufacturer and supplier of adult incontinence care products in Europe, from Rutland Partners for €180 million, pursuant to a definitive agreement entered into on January 26, 2012. The brand was founded by Procter and Gamble in 1979.

Merger with Weyerhaeuser

On August 22, 2006, Domtar, Inc. agreed to merge with the paper division of Weyerhaeuser. The merger was effected as an arrangement under the Canada Business Corporations Act, taking place in several steps:

 Weyerhauser transferred its division to Weyerhauser TIA, Inc., whose shares would be spun off to Weyerhauser's shareholders.
 Domtar's shareholders would exchange their shares for those of Weyerhauser TIA.
 The shareholdings were effectively split 55% for Weyerhauser's shareholders and 45% for Domtar's former shareholders.
 Weyerhauser had the right to nominate a majority of the new board of directors.

On March 7, 2007, the transaction officially closed, and Weyerhauser TIA was subsequently renamed as Domtar Corporation.

In March 2013, Domtar announced it was acquiring Xerox's US and Canadian Paper businesses and began being the exclusive seller and distributor of Xerox products as of June 1, 2013.
 
Cornwall coated cover was produced for a time in Chinese paper mills due to the closure of the Cornwall, Ontario plant, but production has since ceased.

Acquisition by Paper Excellence

On May 11, 2021, privately held Canadian forest products company Paper Excellence announced that it was acquiring Domtar Corp. for US$2.8-billion.

Environmental issues

Nova Scotia

The company was originally known as the Dominion Tar and Chemical Company, Limited. Its first plant was located in Cape Breton, Nova Scotia.

Dominion Tar and Chemical Company Ltd (Domtar) operated a coal tar refining plant and a coal tar storage facility in Sydney from 1903 to 1962. This facility was situated directly adjacent to and north of the coke oven operations. It diverted coal tar from the coke ovens, refined it, moved it through pipes, and stored it in tanks for shipping elsewhere. Domtar ceased operations in Sydney in 1962 abandoning its storage tanks, waste disposal lagoons, pipes, buildings and equipment. Domtar conducted little or no clean up of the site. A large tank, referred to as the "Domtar tank", remained in place adjacent to the coke ovens site into the 2000s, measuring 28 m (92 ft.) in diameter and 6 m (20 ft.) high. It contained materials abandoned by Domtar and other materials added in the years since the facility's abandonment.

This site, which is located adjacent to the former Sydney Steel plant, is included in a $400 million government sponsored cleanup of what is referred to as the Sydney Tar Ponds.

In 2008 Domtar partnered with WWF as a part of an ongoing effort to help them source their materials responsibly. They are also a long-time member of the Two Sides initiative.

Cornwall

Domtar operated a paper mill in Cornwall until 2006. The original mill was built by the Toronto Manufacturing Company in 1881 and purchased by Howard Smith Paper Mills in 1919.

In the early 1970s, Domtar persuaded the City of Cornwall to permit the dumping of its paper mill waste (sludge, bark and lime dregs) behind a shopping mall in the middle of the city. Part of the dump was sodded over while dumping continued, and Domtar funded a "bunny" ski hill there, known as "Big Ben".

By the late 1980s, Domtar was pumping "an average of 102 million litres of waste water into the St. Lawrence River every day". In May 1988, Greenpeace hung a banner from the company's smokestacks demanding: 'Zero discharge now', referring to discharges of heavy metals, PCBs, phenols, and dioxin. Domtar was "fighting efforts to make it clean up" and it was listed as one of the worst polluters in Ontario in 1989.

By the mid-1990s this Domtar landfill was rapidly filling up with sludge, bark, and lime dregs from the Cornwall kraft and fine paper mill. The problem was exacerbated when new waste water regulations required the Cornwall mill to also remove lignin and starch—formerly discharged into the St. Lawrence River—from its waste water. In response, Domtar began selling dewatered mill waste to Cornwall and area residents labeled as "Soil Conditioner".

For some five years—until high levels of fecal coliforms and fecal streptococcus were discovered in the waste—this "Soil Conditioner" was sold for home garden use and was used by local farmers as fertilizer. Domtar at first claimed that their process could not have contributed e-coli and fecal coli from human feces. The company later revealed to the Ontario Ministry of the Environment (MOE) that some toilets and urinals at the mill connected with the mill's waste water treatment process, rather than with the city's sanitary sewers. Moreover, a stormwater system also emptied into the sludge generating system.

The paper mill site (now a brownfield) was sold to Paris Holdings of Cornwall in 2006 with undisclosed terms and covenants relating to liability and clean up of soil and water affected, for over 120 years, by mill and human waste. Domtar still maintains control of the adjacent dump which is the source of a leachate plume polluting ground water between it and the St. Lawrence River (with the City of Cornwall Water Purification Plant in between). The dump which is officially named, the "Big Ben Landfill And Recreation Area", currently receives demolition waste and asbestos from the decommissioned paper mill.

In 2007, Domtar Corporation made a request to the MOE to additionally allow the dumping of soil at "Big Ben", contaminated with coal tar and bitumen waste, from another Dominion Tar and Chemical Co. Limited site in Cornwall. This manufacturing facility at 7th St. W. and Cumberland Street in Cornwall produced "bituminous fibre" pipe, from 1929 to 1976 known variously as; Cornwall "Standard" Fibre Conduit (1929–38), Cornwall Nocrete Conduit (1938–44), and finally No-co-rode Co. Ltd. – Fibre Conduit Division (1944–76).

In September 2008, over public opposition and in spite of MOE reports indicating off-site leachate impact from the dump and the likelihood of runoff to the St. Lawrence River, the MOE permitted dumping at the "Big Ben" site of contaminated soils from Domtar's former No-co-rode Ltd. site.

Domtar has not remediated its former lands in Cornwall including; its paper mill site, its sludge and bark dump, and its coal tar pipe lands.

Western Canada

Domtar also operated a wood treatment facility in Cochrane, Alberta, treating railroad ties. This ceased operation about 1982, leaving significantly contaminated land. The latest of several clean-up operations is attempting to prevent the underground migration of the main contaminant plume. Building of non-residential structures is now in progress on part of the land.

The company once operated a wood treatment facility in the Transcona section of Winnipeg, Manitoba. The facility has been dismantled, and a residential development was created adjacent to the site in the early 1980s. The site itself remained largely vacant. In the late 1990s, years of debate and scientific study culminated with the re-detoxification. Many properties adjacent to the site were excavated to remove contaminated earth. Dozens of homes had their backyards completely dug up, and a handful also had parts of their homes removed and rebuilt—all at the company's expense. The site itself, was converted to a wildlife sanctuary with a nature path.

Domtar operated a wood treatment plant in northeast Edmonton from 1924 to 1987. The 37-hectare property in question served as a Domtar Inc. wood-treatment operation from 1924 to 1987. Cherokee bought the land in 2010 to build a residential subdivision. Between 1924 and 1987, Domtar used this area to treat wood with creosote and other chemicals. Until 1972, the company simply dumped its untreated waste into a drainage ditch. When the plant went out of business, the soil and groundwater were left contaminated. In 1991, the Edmonton Board of Health issued warning letters, telling Hermitage neighbours to keep their children away from that area.

But Domtar and a Toronto-based brownfield specialist, Cherokee, carried out extensive remediation of the site. Eventually, Cherokee bought the whole 37-hectare parcel for $1.8 million. Parts of the property were more polluted than others.

Other locations

Dayton, Ohio

Other Domtar sites contaminated by creosote and coal tar by products include; "Sunalta" in Calgary, Alberta; Truro, Nova Scotia; Newcastle, New Brunswick; and New Westminster, British Columbia.
Domtar also operated a tie treating plant in Trenton, Ontario for many years.

Domtar operated a paper mill in Toronto from 1961 to late 1980s and is now site of Crothers Woods.

As of 2019, amongst the COVID-19 outbreak, Domtar announced a temporary reduction at its paper-making capacity at its Kingsport Mill, Tennessee due to decreased demand during the pandemic.

Permanent paper machine closures have been further announced at the Ashdown, Arkansas pulp and paper mill, and the Port Huron, Michigan paper mill.

Business segments

Paper 

Air dry metric ton

Research facility

In 2010, Domtar joined with FPInnovations to create a new company that uses nanocrystalline cellulose, a material whose applications potentially include optically reflective films, high-durability varnishes, and innovative bioplastics.  A new experimental plant will be located at the Domtar's Windsor, Quebec pulp and paper mill site.

Distribution

Personal care

Domtar has manufacturing, distribution and research and development facilities in the following locations:

 Greenville, North Carolina
 Aneby, Sweden
 Jesup, Georgia 
In January 2021, the company announces that it has entered into an agreement to sell its personal care business to American Industrial Partners (AIP) for $920 million. This decision follows a strategic review of the business in August 2020 and the decision to reinforce its strategy on focused business portfolio.

See also 
 List of paper mills
 Pulp and paper industry in Canada

References

External links 
 
 

Companies formerly listed on the New York Stock Exchange
Companies formerly listed on the Toronto Stock Exchange
1848 establishments in England
Manufacturing companies based in South Carolina
Fort Mill, South Carolina
Manufacturing companies established in 1848
Pulp and paper companies of the United States